GNOME, originally an acronym for GNU Network Object Model Environment, is a free and open-source desktop environment for Linux and other Unix-like operating systems.

GNOME is the default desktop environment of many major Linux distributions, including Debian, Endless OS, Fedora Linux, Red Hat Enterprise Linux, SUSE Linux Enterprise, Ubuntu, and Tails; it is also the default in Oracle Solaris, a Unix operating system.

GNOME is developed by the GNOME Project, which is composed of both volunteers and paid contributors, the largest corporate contributor being Red Hat. It is an international project that aims to develop frameworks for software development, to program end-user applications based on these frameworks, and to coordinate efforts for internationalization, localization and accessibility of that software.

History

GNOME 1 

It was founded in part because K Desktop Environment, which was growing in popularity, relied on the Qt widget toolkit which used a proprietary software license until version 2.0 (June 1999). In place of Qt, GTK (GNOME Toolkit, at that time called GIMP Toolkit) was chosen as the base of GNOME. GTK uses the GNU Lesser General Public License (LGPL), a free software license that allows software linking to it to use a much wider set of licenses, including proprietary software licenses. GNOME itself is licensed under the LGPL for its libraries, and the GNU General Public License (GPL) for its applications.

GNOME used to be part of the GNU Project, but that is no longer the case. In 2021, GNOME Executive Director Neil McGovern publicly tweeted that GNOME was not a GNU project and that he had been asking GNU to remove GNOME from their list of packages since 2019; in 2021, GNOME was removed from the list. GNOME proceeded to remove mentions of any link to GNU from their code and documentation. The name "GNOME" was initially an acronym of GNU Network Object Model Environment, referring to the original intention of creating a distributed object framework similar to Microsoft's OLE, but the acronym was eventually dropped because it no longer reflected the vision of the GNOME project.

The California startup Eazel developed the Nautilus file manager from 1999 to 2001. De Icaza and Nat Friedman founded Helix Code (later Ximian) in 1999 in Massachusetts; this company developed GNOME's infrastructure and applications and was purchased by Novell in 2003.

During the transition to GNOME 2 and shortly thereafter, there were brief talks about creating a GNOME Office suite. On 15 September 2003 GNOME-Office 1.0, consisting of AbiWord 2.0, GNOME-DB 1.0, and Gnumeric 1.2.0, was released. Although some release planning for GNOME Office 1.2 was happening on gnome-office mailing list, and Gnumeric 1.4 was announced as a part of it, the 1.2 release of the suite itself never materialized. , the GNOME wiki only mentions "GNOME/GTK applications that are useful in an office environment".

GNOME 2 

GNOME 2 was released in June 2002 and was very similar to a conventional desktop interface, featuring a simple desktop in which users could interact with virtual objects, such as windows, icons, and files. GNOME 2 started out with Sawfish as its default window manager, but later switched to Metacity in GNOME 2.2. The handling of windows, applications, and files in GNOME 2 is similar to that of contemporary desktop operating systems. In the default configuration of GNOME 2, the desktop has a launcher menu for quick access to installed programs and file locations; open windows may be accessed by a taskbar along the bottom of the screen, and the top-right corner features a notification area for programs to display notices while running in the background. However, these features can be moved to almost any position or orientation the user desires, replaced with other functions, or removed altogether.
As of 2009, GNOME 2 was the default desktop for OpenSolaris. The MATE desktop environment is a fork of the GNOME 2 codebase (see Criticism, below.)

GNOME 3 

In 2008, an increasing discontent among community and developers about the lack of project direction and technical progress prompted the announcement of GNOME 3.0. Originally, the plan was to make only incremental changes and avoid disruption for users. This changed when efforts led to the creation of the GNOME Shell.

GNOME 3 was released in 2011. While GNOME 1 and 2 interfaces followed the traditional desktop metaphor, the GNOME Shell adopted a more abstract metaphor with streamlined window management workflow (where switching between different tasks and virtual desktops took place in a separate area called theoverview), unified header bar (replacing menu bar, taskbar, and toolbar),, and minimize and maximize buttons hidden by default.

GNOME 3 brought many enhancements to core software. Many GNOME Core Applications also went through redesigns to provide a more consistent user experience. Mutter replaced Metacity as the default window manager. Adwaita replaced Clearlooks as the default theme.

Criticism 
The release of GNOME 3 caused considerable controversy in the GNU and Linux communities. Aiming to provide an easy-to-use and uncluttered user experience has led to some criticized design decisions, like removal of minimize and maximize buttons, simplification of configuration options, and visual clues which could lead to confusion.

A few projects have been initiated to continue development of GNOME 2.x or to modify GNOME 3.x to be more like the 2.x releases:

 The MATE desktop environment was forked from the GNOME 2 code-base with the intent of retaining the traditional GNOME 2 interface whilst keeping compatibility with modern Linux technology, such as GTK 3.
 The Linux Mint team addressed the issue by developing "Mint GNOME Shell Extensions" that ran on top of GNOME Shell and allowed it to be used via the traditional desktop metaphor. This eventually led to the creation of the Cinnamon user interface, which was forked from the GNOME 3 codebase.
 The LXDE Project, which was experimenting with a Qt port at the time, joined the Razor-qt Team and became LXQt.
 Canonical, the company developing Ubuntu, ceased working with the GNOME Shell developers during the GNOME 3 planning phases  and released their own shell Unity, replacing GNOME as the default desktop shell in Ubuntu 11.04 "Natty Narwhal" released in April 2011. Previously, Unity had been only been intended for use with the Ubuntu Netbook Edition starting with version 10.10 and a now-canceled edition of Ubuntu called Ubuntu Light.

Among those critical of the early releases of GNOME 3 is Linus Torvalds, the creator of the Linux kernel. Torvalds abandoned GNOME for a while after the release of GNOME 3.0, saying, "The developers have apparently decided that it's 'too complicated' to actually do real work on your desktop, and have decided to make it really annoying to do". He then switched to Xfce.

Over time, critical reception has grown more positive. In 2013, Torvalds resumed using GNOME, noting that "they have extensions now that are still much too hard to find; but with extensions you can make your desktop look almost as good as it used to look two years ago". Debian, a Linux distribution that had historically used GNOME 2, switched to Xfce when GNOME 3 was released, but re-adopted GNOME 3 in time for the release of Debian 8 "Jessie". Ubuntu switched from Unity to GNOME 3 with several extensions to resemble Unity, such as a persistent left application panel instead of a hidden dock and re-enabling desktop icons, with Ubuntu 17.10 Artful Aardvark in 2017. This release also saw the Ubuntu GNOME edition merged with the mainline release.

GNOME 40 
GNOME 40 was released on 24 March 2021. It immediately follows version 3 but adopts a new versioning scheme, and a schedule of future major releases on a fixed six-month cycle (see Release Cycle).  

GNOME 40 organizes workspaces and the dash in a horizontal fashion, instead of using a vertical design in its activities overview like its predecessors. The release also brings new touchpad gestures.

GNOME 41 
GNOME 41 was released on 22 September 2021 and introduced a rewritten and redesigned GNOME Software application manager, a multitasking panel and a mobile network (for WWAN) panel in settings, a new remote desktop app called Connections, updates to GNOME Music app, and improvements to the power mode settings.

GNOME 42 
GNOME 42 was released on 23 March 2022  and introduces the option to screen record, switch light/dark themes using a new GTK API called Libadwaita. It switches some defaults apps such as Text Editor instead of Gedit and Console instead of Terminal/Tilix (said to only be replaced for non-advanced users)

GNOME 43 
GNOME 43 (Guadalajara) was released on 21 September 2022 and introduces new quick settings, a GNOME Files update to GTK4, new device security panel in settings and GNOME Web bringing in support for web apps and experimental extension support with Firefox extensions and Chrome extensions among many other changes.

Releases

Release cycle 
Each of the component software products in the GNOME project has its own version number and release schedule. However, individual module maintainers coordinate their efforts to create a full GNOME stable release on an approximately six-month schedule, alongside its underlying libraries such as GTK and GLib. Some experimental projects are excluded from these releases.

Before GNOME 40, GNOME version numbers followed the scheme v.xx.yy. Here, v is a major version, which can include large changes such as ABI breakage; these have no regular schedule and occur in response to requirements for large-scale changes. xx is a minor version, released on the above schedule of approximately every 6 months, in which the 1- or 2-digit number's parity indicates the type of release: if xx is even (e.g. 3.20) the release is considered stable, whereas if xx is odd, it represents a current development snapshot (e.g. 3.21) that will eventually evolve into the next stable release. yy indicates a point release, e.g. 3.20.6; these are made on a frequency of weeks in order to fix issues, add non-breaking enhancements, etc.

GNOME 40 started a new versioning scheme in which a single number is incremented each biannual release. The number is followed by a dot and then "alpha", "beta", or "rc" for a development release, or a decimal for a minor stable release (much like the yy mentioned previously).

GNOME releases are made to the main FTP server in the form of source code with configure scripts, which are compiled by operating system vendors and integrated with the rest of their systems before distribution. Most vendors only use stable and tested versions of GNOME, and provide it in the form of easily installed, pre-compiled packages. The source code of every stable and development version of GNOME is stored in the GNOME git source code repository. Interested users can obtain a snapshot of a git branch and build a cutting-edge version for their own use.

A number of build scripts (such as JHBuild or formerly GARNOME) are available to help automate the process of compiling the source code.

Release history

Features

User interface design 

Since GNOME 2, productivity has been a key focus for GNOME. To meet this end, the GNOME Human Interface Guidelines (HIG) were created. All GNOME programs share a coherent style of graphical user interface (GUI) but are not limited to the employment of the same GUI widgets. Rather, the design of the GNOME GUI is guided by concepts described in the GNOME HIG, itself relying on insights from cognitive ergonomics. Following the HIG, developers can create high-quality, consistent, and usable GUI programs, as it addresses everything from GUI design to recommended pixel-based layout of widgets.

During the GNOME 2 rewrite, many settings deemed of little value to the majority of users were removed. The guiding principle was outlined by Havoc Pennington – a software developer involved in the project – who emphasized the idea that it is better to make software behave correctly by default than to add a UI preference to get the desired behavior:

Accessibility 

GNOME aims to make and keep the desktop environment physically and cognitively ergonomic for people with disabilities. The GNOME HIG tries to take this into account as far as possible but specific issues are solved by special software.

GNOME addresses computer accessibility issues by using the Accessibility Toolkit (ATK) application programming interface, which allows enhancing user experience by using special input methods and speech synthesis and speech recognition software. Particular utilities are registered with ATK using Assistive Technology Service Provider Interface (AT-SPI), and become globally used throughout the desktop. Several assistive technology providers, including Orca screen reader and Dasher input method, were developed specifically for use with GNOME.

Internationalization and localization 

The internationalization and localization of GNOME software relies on locale, and supports 197 languages with varying levels of completion, with some not being translated at all.

Desktop and mobile sessions 
GNOME allows for at least three different kinds of login sessions for desktop and one for mobile:

GNOME Shell 

This session is based on GNOME Shell and Mutter (window manager). It is default and offers a mobile-like paradigm for launching applications and accessing open windows and virtual desktops, but through the use of extensions it is possible for the appearance to be that of a traditional taskbar and provide a basic start menu. This session uses more RAM and CPU due to use of JavaScript for GNOME Shell and all of its extensions, and requiring 3D acceleration.

GNOME Shell is the default graphical shell of GNOME. It features a top bar holding (from left to right) an Activities button, an application menu, a clock and an integrated system status menu. The application menu displays the name of the application in focus and provides access to functions such as accessing the application's preferences, closing the application, or creating a new application window. The status menu holds various system status indicators, shortcuts to system settings, and session actions including logging out, switching users, locking the screen, and suspending the computer.

Clicking on the Activities button, moving the mouse to the top-left hot corner or pressing the Super key brings up the Overview. The Overview gives users an overview of current activities and provides a way to switch between windows and workspaces and to launch applications. The Dash on the left houses shortcuts to favorite applications and open windows and an application picker button to show a list of all installed applications. A search bar appears at the top and a workspace list for switching between workspaces is on the right. Notifications appear from the bottom of the screen.

GNOME Classic 
Beginning with GNOME 3.8, GNOME provides a suite of officially supported GNOME Shell extensions that provide Applications menu (a basic start menu) and "Places menu" on the top bar, and a panel with windows list at the bottom of the screen that lets quickly minimize and restore open windows, a "Show Desktop" button in the bottom left and virtual desktops in the bottom right corner.

GNOME Flashback 

GNOME Flashback is an official session for GNOME 3. Based on GNOME Panel and Metacity, it is lightweight, has lower hardware requirements, and uses less system resources than GNOME Shell. It provides a traditional and highly customizable taskbar (panel) with many plug-ins bundled in one package (gnome-applets) including a customizable start menu. It provides a similar user experience to the GNOME 2.x series and has customization capacities as built-in.

GNOME Flashback consists of the following components:
 Metacity (window manager)
 GNOME Panel – a highly configurable taskbar
 gnome-applets – a collection of useful applets for the GNOME Panel

Mobile 

The libhandy library can be used with GNOME Shell to create a responsive user interface that dynamically adapts to device form factor. With the release of GTK4 the libhandy library was replaced by the libadwaita library for creating responsive user interfaces.

Development 
GNOME is developed by GNOME Project. GNOME development is loosely managed. Since the introduction of Discourse forum in 2019, the discussion moved from mailing lists and in October 2022, the project announced the plan to close all its public mailing lists.

GNOME developers and users gather at an annual GUADEC meeting to discuss the current state and the future direction of GNOME. GNOME incorporates standards and programs from freedesktop.org to better support interoperability with other desktops.

GNOME is mainly written in C, XML, C++, C#, HTML, Vala, Python, JavaScript, CSS, and more. A number of language bindings are available.

Development platform 
The GLib data structures and utilities library, GObject object and type system and GTK widget toolkit comprise the central part of GNOME development platform. This foundation is further extended with D-Bus IPC framework, Cairo 2D vector-based drawing library, Clutter accelerated graphics library, Pango international text rendering library, PulseAudio and PipeWire low-level audio APIs, GStreamer multimedia framework, and several specialized libraries including NetworkManager, PackageKit, Telepathy (instant messaging), and WebKit.
 GNOME Display Manager (GDM), which manages user sessions, X and Wayland alike.
 Tracker automatically searches the specified directories for files and keeps an index of them to provide fast search; heavily integrated into GNOME Shell and GNOME Files
 GVfs, an abstraction layer framework for file systems augmenting GIO; well integrated into GNOME Files and GNOME Disks
 dconf a backend for GSettings
 Mutter, the Wayland compositor and X Window Manager
 Linux color management, udev, etc.
 Evolution Data Server, responsible for managing mail, calendar, address book, tasks and memo information
 Meson is replacing GNU Build System (autotools) as build automation tools of choice
 BuildStream, a distribution agnostic build and integration tool

Dependencies 
The GNOME desktop environment does not consist solely of the graphical control element library GTK and the core applications that make use of it. There are quite a few additional software packages that make up the GNOME desktop environment, such as the above.

Wayland or X Window System 

GNOME runs on Wayland and the X Window System. Wayland support was introduced in GNOME 3.10 and deemed "for the majority of users […] a usable day to day experience" by 3.20, at which point Wayland became the default user session. With GNOME 3.24, Wayland compatibility was extended to Nvidia drivers. With GNOME 3.30 or later, it is possible to run GNOME without the X Window System, using only Wayland.

systemd 

In May 2011 Lennart Poettering proposed systemd as a GNOME dependency. 
As systemd is available only on Linux, the proposal led to a discussion of possibly dropping support for other platforms in future GNOME releases. Since GNOME 3.2 multiseat support has only been available on systems using systemd. 
In November 2012 the GNOME release team concluded there will be no compile time dependency on systemd for basic functionality, like session tracking. For non-basic functionality, like power management, compile time dependency is possible. For example, there is no concept of systemd inhibitors in alternatives like consolekit. A package manager may want to ensure that the system is not turned off while the upgrade is taking place.

Applications

Core Applications 

There are a large number of GTK and Clutter-based programs written by various authors. Since the release of GNOME 3.0, GNOME Project concentrates on developing a set of programs that accounts for the GNOME Core Applications. The commonalities of the GNOME Core Applications are the adherence to the current GNOME Human Interface Guidelines (HIG) as well as the tight integration with underlying GNOME layers like e.g. GVfs (GNOME virtual filesystem) and also with one another e.g. GOA (gnome-online-accounts) settings and GNOME Files with Google Drive and GNOME Photos with Google Photos. Some programs are simply existing programs with a new name and revamped user interface, while others have been written from scratch.

Games 

GNOME Games have the look and feel of the GNOME Core Applications and are released simultaneously with GNOME. All have been rewritten to conform to the current GNOME Human Interface Guidelines.

Development tools 
Programmers have written software to provide development tools consistent with the GNOME desktop and to facilitate the development of GNOME software.

GNOME Builder is the new integrated development environment, Anjuta is the older one. Glade Interface Designer software constructs graphical interfaces using the graphical control elements in GTK. Devhelp is an API browser, Accerciser an accessibility explorer.

There are several debugging tools, including Nemiver, GtkInspector and Alleyoop, have also been provided to facilitate development of GNOME software.

Integration options for third-party development tools (e.g. NoFlo) also exist.

The libsoup library enables access to HTTP servers from GNOME applications.

BuildStream is a flexible and extensible framework for the modeling of build and CI pipelines in a declarative YAML format, written in Python. Its mascot is a Beaver, because beavers build things in a stream.

See also 
 GNOME Foundation
 GNOME Project
 GNOME Panel
 GNOME Shell
 GNOME 1
 GNOME 2
 GNOME 3
 KDE
 Comparison of X Window System desktop environments

References

External links 

 

 
1999 software
Desktop environments based on GTK
Free desktop environments
Free software programmed in C
GNU Project
Unix windowing system-related software